German Open is a name given to many sports events established in Germany, and include:
German Open (badminton), an annual badminton tournament held since 1955.
German Open (golf), was a golf tournament on the European Tour
German Masters, a snooker tournament formerly known as "German Open"
German Open (darts), a professional darts tournament
German Open Tennis Championships, a professional tennis tournament on the ATP World Tour, formerly known as the ATP German Open and German Open International.
German Open (WTA), professional tennis tournament on the WTA Tour
German Open (table tennis), an ITTF table tennis tournament